Baron Pál Sennyey de Kissennye (24 April 1822 – 3 January 1888) was a Hungarian conservative politician, who served as Speaker of the House of Magnates twice; between 1865 and 1867 and from 1884 to 1888, his death. He also functioned as chairman of the Royal Council of Governor (1865–1867), Master of the Treasury (1865–1867) and Lord Chief Justice (1884–1888).

Sennyey strongly opposed the Hungarian Revolution of 1848. He participated in development of the Austro-Hungarian Compromise after 1862. He was the leader of the conservative landowners' Right-wing Opposition which left the governing Liberal Party in 1875.

References
 Jónás, Károly - Villám, Judit: A Magyar Országgyűlés elnökei 1848–2002. Argumentum, Budapest, 2002. pp. 197–201

1822 births
1888 deaths
Judges royal
Masters of the treasury (Kingdom of Hungary)
Speakers of the House of Magnates
Members of the Hungarian Academy of Sciences